United Nations Security Council resolution 1610, adopted unanimously on 30 June 2005, after recalling all previous resolutions on the situation in Sierra Leone, the Council extended the mandate of the United Nations Mission in Sierra Leone (UNAMSIL) for a final six months until 31 December 2005.

Resolution

Observations
In the preamble of the resolution, the council emphasised the importance of long-term support for Sierra Leone by the United Nations and international community. The Secretary-General Kofi Annan had approved the drawdown schedule for UNAMSIL and the need for a strong United Nations presence in Sierra Leone once it had left. It welcomed the work of the Truth and Reconciliation Commission and the Special Court for Sierra Leone.

Acts
Acting under Chapter VII of the United Nations Charter, the council extended the mandate of UNAMSIL until the end of 2005. The secretary-general was required to finalise arrangements for a United Nations system presence in Sierra Leone, urging a smooth transition as Sierra Leonean security forces would assume responsibility after the withdrawal of UNAMSIL.

Meanwhile, the government of Sierra Leone was called upon to develop an effective and sustainable police force, armed forces, judiciary and penal system. The council also asked United Nations peacekeeping operations in the region to enhance co-operation.

See also
 Ivorian Civil War
 List of United Nations Security Council Resolutions 1601 to 1700 (2005–2006)
 Second Liberian Civil War
 Sierra Leone Civil War
 Special Court for Sierra Leone

References

External links
 
Text of the Resolution at undocs.org

 1610
2005 in Sierra Leone
 1610
Sierra Leone Civil War
June 2005 events